Lakesland is a locality next to the Nattai National Park of New South Wales, Australia, in Wollondilly Shire.

References

Towns in the Macarthur (New South Wales)
Towns in New South Wales
Wollondilly Shire